The Spanish Socialist Workers' Party (PSOE ) is a social-democratic political party in Spain. The PSOE has been in government longer than any other political party in modern democratic Spain, namely from 1982 to 1996 under Felipe González; from 2004 to 2011 under José Luis Rodríguez Zapatero; and currently since 2018 under Pedro Sánchez.

The PSOE was founded in 1879, making it the oldest party currently active in Spain. The PSOE played a key role during the Second Spanish Republic, being part of coalition government from 1931 to 1933 and from 1936 to 1939, when the Republic was defeated by Francisco Franco in the Spanish Civil War. The party was then banned under Franco's dictatorship and its members and leaders were persecuted or exiled. The PSOE was only legalised again in 1977. Historically a Marxist party, it abandoned Marxism in 1979. Just like most mainstream Spanish political organizations since the mid-1980s, PSOE has been considered by experts to embrace a positive outlook towards European integration.

The PSOE has historically had strong ties with the General Union of Workers (UGT), a Spanish trade union. For a couple of decades, UGT membership was a requirement for PSOE membership. Since the 1980s, the UGT has frequently criticized the economic policies of the PSOE, even calling for several general strikes against the PSOE governments on 14 December 1988, 28 May 1992, 27 January 1994 and 29 September 2010, all jointly with the Workers' Commissions, another major trade union. Both the trade unions and the left have often criticized the economic policies of the PSOE for its economic liberal nature, have denounced the policies of deregulation and generalization of the precarious and temporary work, cuts in social benefits such as unemployment and retirement as well as the privatisations of big companies and public services.

The PSOE is a member of the Party of European Socialists, Progressive Alliance and the Socialist International. In the European Parliament, the PSOE's 20 Members of the European Parliament sit in the Socialists and Democrats European parliamentary group.

History

Restoration regime (1879–1931) 

The PSOE was founded by Pablo Iglesias on 2 May 1879 in the Casa Labra tavern in Tetuán Street near the Puerta del Sol at the centre of Madrid. Iglesias was a typesetter who had become in contact in the past with the Spanish section of the International Workingmen's Association and with Paul Lafargue. The first program of the new political party was passed in an assembly of 40 people on 20 July of that same year. The bulk of the growth of the PSOE and its affiliated trade union, the Unión General de Trabajadores (UGT) was chiefly restricted to the Madrid-Biscay-Asturias triangle up until the 1910s. The obtaining of a seat at the Congress by Pablo Iglesias at the 1910 Spanish general election in which the PSOE candidates presented within the broad Republican–Socialist Conjunction became a development of great symbolical transcendence and gave the party more publicity at the national level.

The PSOE and the UGT took a leading role in the general strike of August 1917 in the context of the events leading to the Spanish crisis of 1917 during the conservative government of Eduardo Dato. The strike was crushed by the army with the result of further undermining of the constitutional order. The members of the organizing committee (Julián Besteiro, Francisco Largo Caballero, Daniel Anguiano and Andrés Saborit) were accused of sedition and sentenced to life imprisonment. Sent to the prison of Cartagena, they were released a year later after being elected to the Cortes in the 1918 Spanish general election. During the 1919−1921 crisis of the socialist internationals, the party experienced tensions between the members endorsing the Socialist International and the advocates for joining the Communist International. Two consecutive splits of dissidents willing to join the Communist International, namely the Spanish Communist Party in 1920 and the Spanish Communist Workers' Party in 1921, broke away from the PSOE and soon merged to create the Communist Party of Spain (PCE). The PSOE was a member of the Labour and Socialist International between 1923 and 1940.

After the death of Pablo Iglesias in 1925, Julián Besteiro replaced him as president of both the PSOE and the UGT. During the 1923–1930 dictatorship of Miguel Primo de Rivera, corporatist PSOE and UGT elements were willing to engage into limited collaboration with the regime, against the political stance defended by other socialists such as Indalecio Prieto and Fernando de los Ríos, who instead advocated a closer collaboration with republican forces. The last years of the dictatorship saw a divergence emerge among the corporatist which was personified in Francisco Largo Caballero, who began to endorse the rapport with bourgeois republicans; and Julián Besteiro, who continued to show great distrust towards them. Besteiro's refusal to participate in the Revolutionary Committee led to his resignation as president both of the party and the trade union in February 1931. He was replaced as president of the party by Remigio Cabello.

Second Republic and Civil War (1931–1939) 

After the proclamation of the Second Spanish Republic on 14 April 1931, three PSOE members were included in the cabinet of the provisional government, namely Indalecio Prieto (Finance), Fernando de los Ríos (Education) and Francisco Largo Caballero (Labour). The socialist presence remained in the rest of cabinets of the Social-Azañist Biennium (1931–1933).

After the November 1933 general election which marked a win for the centre-right forces in a climate of increasing polarization and growing unemployment, along with a desire to make amends for the mistake of not having sided with the republicans in the election against the united right, Largo Caballero adopted a revolutionary rhetoric, calling for violent revolution and a transitionary dictatorship of the proletariat. Indalecio Prieto had also participated in the increasingly aggressive rhetoric, having already condemned the heavy-hand repression of the December 1933 largely anarchist uprising by the government, that has been cheered on by the CEDA leaders on parliament. The Socialist Youth of Spain (JSE) also engaged into a shrilling revolutionary rhetoric while Besteiro firmly opposed the insurrectionary drift of the militancy.

The formation of a new cabinet that included CEDA ministers in October 1934 was perceived among the left as a reaction, with the CEDA party being indistinguishable from contemporary fascism to most workers while CEDA leader Gil-Robles had advocated the establishment of a corporative state already in the 1933 electoral campaign. The UGT called for a nationwide general strike for 5 October which developed into a full-blown insurrection (the Revolution of 1934) in the mining region of Asturias which was vocally supported by socialists such as Largo Caballero and Prieto. After the end of the revolt, whose repression was entrusted to Generals Francisco Franco and Manuel Goded, most PSOE and UGT leaders were jailed.

A growing rift between Prieto and Largo Caballero (with disparate views of politics, albeit sharing a general pragmatist approach) formed in 1935 while Besteiro's hold on the party diminished significantly. Followers of Indalecio Prieto would ultimately become "estranged from the party left". The PSOE formed part of the broad left-wing Popular Front electoral coalition that stood for election in the 1936 Spanish general election and achieved a victory in seats over the right.

In September 1936, a few months into the Spanish Civil War (1936–1939), a cabinet presided over by Largo Caballero was formed (he also held the functions of Minister of War). In November, Largo Caballero succeeded in bringing some CNT members into his government. The left socialist caballeristas were revolutionary in rhetoric, although in reality they proposed moderate reformist policies while in government. The May Days of 1937 in Barcelona destabilised the government which was replaced by a new cabinet led by Juan Negrín, another socialist.

Clandestinity and exile (1939–1974) 

With the PSOE reduced to clandestinity during the Francoist dictatorship, its members were persecuted, with many leaders, members and supporters being imprisoned or exiled and even executed. Prime Minister Negrín fled to France in March 1939 after the final collapse of the Republican front and his fall from office. The aging and ill Julián Besteiro, who preferred to stay in Spain over exile, died in a Francoist prison in 1940. Julián Zugazagoitia, government minister in 1937–1938, was captured in exile by the Gestapo, handed over to Spain and executed in 1940. The party was legalized again only in 1977 during the Spanish transition to democracy.

Disputes between the followers of Indalecio Prieto (who had exiled to Mexico) and Juan Negrín over the political strategy of the Republican government in exile soon arose. Negrín, whose 1937–1939 spell at the government in wartime was seen negatively by large elements of both caballerista and prietista extraction, had become vilified. The party was re-organized along new lines in 1944 in the 1st Congress in Exile that took place in Toulouse and in which Rodolfo Llopis became the party's new secretary-general.

The PSOE congresses in exile during the post-war period were marked by strong anti-communist positions as a reflection of how the exiles remembered the last events of the Civil War (which featured bitter strifes with the communists) and in line with the stance of other parties of the Socialist International during the Cold War, neglecting any kind of rapprochement with the Spanish Communist Party (PCE). The relative void left in Spain by the PSOE, with a Toulouse-based direction lacking in dynamism and innovation, was filled by the PCE and other new clandestine organizations such as the Agrupación Socialista Universitaria (ASU), the Popular Liberation Front (FELIPE) or later the Enrique Tierno Galván's Socialist Party of the Interior. The Toulouse executive board became increasingly detached from the party in Spain in the 1960s an insurmountable chasm between the former and the party in the interior was already defined by 1972.

Return to democracy

González leadership (1974–1996) 

The 25th party congress was held in Toulouse in August 1972. In 1974, Felipe González was elected Secretary-General at the 26th party congress in Suresnes, replacing Llopis. González was from the reform wing of the party and his victory signaled a defeat for the historic and veteran wing of the party. The direction of the PSOE shifted from the exiles to the young people in Spain who had not fought the war. Llopis led a schism to form the Spanish Socialist Workers' Party (historic). González showed intentions to move the party away from its Marxist and socialist background, turning the PSOE into a social-democratic party, similar to those of the rest of western Europe. In 1977, the PSOE became the unofficial opposition leading party with 29.2% of the vote and 118 seats in the Cortes Generales (which until then it had been the PCE, leading more aggressively among a larger representation of underground parties since the last free popular vote during the Civil War on Republican territory). Their standing was further boosted in 1978 when the Popular Socialist Party agreed to merge into the PSOE.

At the 27th party congress in May 1979, González resigned because the party would not abandon its Marxist character. In September of that year, the extraordinary 28th congress was called in which González was re-elected when the party agreed to move away from Marxism. Western European social-democratic parties supported González's stand and the Social Democratic Party of Germany granted them money. PSOE party symbol was changed from the anvil with the book to the social democratic fist and rose created in the French Socialist Party, redrawn for the PSOE by José María Cruz Novillo. In the 1978 Spanish constitutional referendum, the PSOE supported the Spanish constitution which was approved. In the 1979 Spanish general election, the PSOE gained 30.5% of the vote and 121 seats, remaining the main opposition party. In the 1982 Spanish general election, the PSOE was victorious with 48.1% of the vote (10,127,392 total). González became Prime Minister of Spain on 2 December, a position he held until May 1996.

Although the party had opposed NATO, most party leaders supported keeping Spain inside the organisation after reaching the government. The González administration organised a referendum on the question in 1986, calling for a favourable vote, and won. The administration was criticised for avoiding the official names of North Atlantic Treaty Organisation and NATO, using the unofficial Atlantic Alliance terms. A symbol of this U-turn is Javier Solana who campaigned against NATO but ended up years later as its Secretary General. The PSOE supported the United States in the Gulf War (1991). PSOE won the 1986, 1989 and 1993 general elections. Under the Gonzalez administration, public expenditure on education, health, and pensions rose in total by 4.1 points of the country's GDP between 1982 and 1992.

Economic crisis and state terrorism (GAL) against the violent separatist group ETA eroded the popularity of González. In the 1996 Spanish general election, the PSOE lost to the conservative People's Party (PP) (PP). Between 1996 and 2001, the PSOE weathered a crisis, with Gonzalez resigning in 1997. The PSOE suffered a heavy defeat in the 2000 Spanish general election, with 34.7% of the popular votes. However, the PSOE remained as the ruling party in the autonomous communities of Andalusia, Asturias, Castilla-La Mancha and Extremadura.

Zapatero and Rubalcaba leadership (2000–2014) 
In 2000, José Luis Rodríguez Zapatero was elected as the new Secretary-General, renewing the party. Later, the PSOE won the 2003 Spanish local elections. The PSOE strongly opposed the Iraq War which was supported by the Aznar government.

In the 2003 Catalan regional election, the PSOE's Socialists' Party of Catalonia (PSC) increased its vote total, but ended up in second place after Convergence and Union. After a period of negotiations, the party formed a pact with the Initiative for Catalonia Greens, the Republican Left of Catalonia and the United and Alternative Left, governing Catalonia until 2010.

In the 2004 Spanish general election, the PSOE won with almost 43% of the votes following the 11-M terrorist (11 March) attacks. It was alleged that the PSOE, with the help of the national newspaper El Pais, did not observe the "reflection journey" which forbade political parties from trying to sway public opinion (forbidden by Spanish law), calling the opposing political party "assassins" and blaming the terrorist attack on them. The PSOE maintained their lead in the 2004 European Parliament election.

In 2005, the PSOE called for a yes vote on the European Constitution. The PSOE also favoured the negotiations between the government and the ETA during the 2006 cease-fire which had a de facto end with the Barajas Airport terrorist attack. In the 2008 Spanish general election, the PSOE won again, with Zapatero remaining Prime Minister. The PSOE increased their share of seats in the Congress of Deputies from 164 to 169 after the latest election.

After waning popularity throughout their second term, mainly due to their handling of the worsening economic climate in Spain in the aftermath of the 2008 global financial crisis, the PSOE was defeated in the 2011 Spanish general election by the conservative People's Party. Shortly after, an extraordinary congress was held in which Alfredo Pérez Rubalcaba, former Deputy to Zapatero and Minister of the Interior, was elected Secretary-General defeating Carme Chacón, the other candidate, who stood for the Zapatero platform. This victory caused huge internal divisions and weakened the party's external image.

In 2013, the PSOE held a political conference which introduced a completely new platform, widely seen as a move to the left in an attempt to regain votes from parties such as the United Left, whose popularity rose steadily due to the general discontent with the two-party system and spending cuts. That platform was the basis for the 2014 European Parliament election manifesto, promoted as a solid alternative to the conservative plan for Europe. The expectations inside the party which chose Elena Valenciano as their election candidate were optimistic, but the PSOE suffered another defeat due to the appearance of new parties such as Podemos which managed to gain the support of left-wing voters, with PSOE winning 14 seats. Shortly thereafter, Rubalcaba resigned as Secretary-General and an Extraordinary Congress was convoked.

Sánchez leadership (2014–present) 
This party congress was the first to use a primary election system with three candidates, namely Pedro Sánchez, Eduardo Madina and José Antonio Pérez Tapias. Sánchez was elected with 49% of the vote of the affiliates and therefore became Secretary-General on 27 July 2014.

In the 2015 Spanish municipal elections, the PSOE won 25% of the vote, one of its worst results in since the restoration of democracy. Together with the fall of the People's Party which won 27% of votes, it meant the end of the two-party system in Spain in favor of new parties. The PSOE alone lost 943 councilors. The 2015 Spanish general election produced an hung parliament broken into four major parties. Due to the large increase for parties such as Podemos (left) and Citizens (centre-right), the PSOE got about 20% of the vote, its worst result since democracy was restored. The parliament was so fragmented, no government could be formed and six months later new elections were held. The 2016 Spanish general election resulted in the PSOE losing a further five seats despite gaining 0.6% of the vote (still the party's second-worst popular vote total after 2015 since the restoration of democracy), leaving the party with 85 seats in the parliament, their lowest total since the restoration of democracy and the fewest since the 1933 in Republican Spain left the party with 59 seats in the 473-member parliament.

With the exception of the 2015 Andalusian regional election, elections held during the early leadership of Sánchez were losses for the PSOE. In addition, the policy of pacts conducted by Sánchez after the 2016 general election, based on Sánchez's outright refusal to facilitate a People's Party government, caused a faction within the party critical of Sánchez to gain momentum, led by President of Andalusia Susana Díaz. On 28 September 2016, the Secretary of Federal Policy Antonio Pradas went to the party's headquarters and presented the en bloc resignation of 17 members of the Federal Executive and the demands of those who resigned for the party to be run by an interim manager and to pressure Sánchez to resign as secretary-general. The Executive later lost two more members in the en bloc resignation, bringing the total number of resignations to 19. Resigning executives included the president of the party Micaela Navarro, the former Minister Carme Chacón, the President of Valencia Ximo Puig and the President of Castilla–La Mancha Emiliano García-Page. This launched the 2016 PSOE crisis. On the afternoon of 1 October 2016, after holding a tense Federal Committee meeting, Sánchez resigned as party General-Secretary, forcing an extraordinary party congress to choose a new General-Secretary. That night, it was reported that an interim manager would be chosen, later confirmed to be the President of Asturias Javier Fernández Fernández. Sánchez announced his intention to run for General-Secretary of the party as did Susana Díaz (one of the leaders of the anti-Sánchez faction of the party) and Patxi López, former President of the Basque Autonomous Community. At the 39th federal congress in June 2017, Díaz received 48.3% of endorsements, outpacing both Sánchez (43.0% of endorsements) and López (8.7% of endorsements), but Sánchez won an absolute majority of the party's popular vote at 50.3% (Díaz received 39.9% and López 9.8%). Both Díaz and López withdrew before the delegate vote, returning Sánchez as the General-Secretary and ending the crisis. Sánchez won every region of Spain except for the home regions of López and Díaz.

In mid-2018, the National Court found that the conservative People's Party profited from the illegal kickbacks-for-contracts scheme of the Gürtel case, confirming the existence of an illegal accounting and financing structure that ran in parallel with the party's official one since 1989 and that sentenced that the PP helped to establish "a genuine and effective system of institutional corruption through the manipulation of central, autonomous and local public procurement". The PSOE Parliamentary Group in the Congress of Deputies filed a motion of no confidence against the government of Prime Minister Mariano Rajoy, presenting Sánchez as alternative candidate. The PSOE's motion passed with the support of Unidos Podemos (UP), Republican Left of Catalonia (ERC), Catalan European Democratic Party (PDeCAT), Basque Nationalist Party (PNV), Coalició Compromís, EH Bildu and New Canaries (NCa), bringing down the Rajoy government. The PP voted against the proposal, joined by Citizens (C's), the Navarrese People's Union (UPN) and the Asturias Forum (FAC). The Canarian Coalition (CC) abstained. Following the successful motion of no confidence, Sánchez became Prime Minister on 2 June 2018 in a minority government. In December 2018, the PSOE's branch in Andalusia was defeated in the 2018 Andalusian regional election for the first time since the restoration of democracy, with a centre-right coalition of PP, C's and the resurgent right-wing nationalists Vox taking power in the region.

For most of his first term as Prime Minister, Sánchez relied on support from the UP and the NC to get his agenda passed, occasionally being forced into negotiating with the Catalan separatist parties the ERC and the PDeCAT and the PNV on individual issues. In February 2019, the ERC, the PDeCAT and En Marea withdrew their support of Sánchez's government by voting against and helping defeat the 2019 General State Budget and Sánchez called an early election for 28 April 2019. The April 2019 Spanish general election resulted in victory for the PSOE, with the party winning 123 seats on 28.7% of the vote in the Cortes and an absolute majority of 139 in the Senate, gains of 38 and 79 seats respectively. The PSOE also finished eight percentage points ahead of the PP which finished second in both seats and in the popular vote. At election night, party supporters demanded Sánchez to reject any coalition with Cs. On the same day as the April 2019 general election, the 2019 Valencian regional election resulted in the Valencian branch of the PSOE being re-elected in coalition with the Valencianist party Compromís and UP.

On 26 May 2019, the PSOE became the largest Spanish party in the European Parliament following the 2019 European Parliament election. The PSOE gained six seats to bring their total to 20 and won all but eight provinces in the country. 26 May also saw regional elections for every region in the country except Valencia, Catalonia, Andalusia, the Basque Country and Galicia. In every region, the PSOE gained seats and votes from the 2015 regional elections. The PSOE finished first in terms of votes and seats in every region except for Cantabria, where the Regionalist Party of Cantabria (PRC) finished first and the PSOE third behind the PP; and Navarra, where the conservative regionalist NA+ finished first and the Socialist Party of Navarre finished second. PSOE governments were re-elected in Castilla-La Mancha and Extremadura, with the party receiving an absolute majority of seats in both regions. The party took over the Presidency of the Canary Islands with the support of New Canaries and Podemos, ending 26 years of Canarian Coalition government. On the same date, the PSOE became the largest party in the municipalities following the local elections.

Following months of political deadlock, Sánchez called a second general election in seven months. In the November 2019 Spanish general election, the PSOE lost only three members of parliament and 0.7% of the popular vote in the election, but the PP and VOX gained 23 and 28 seats respectively, further worsening the deadlock. As of 23 December, there was still no government in place, although members of PSOE, PSC and UP have voted overwhelmingly to join in a coalition government, agreed to by Sánchez and UP Secretary-General Pablo Iglesias Turrión. On 5 January 2020, the PSOE–UP government failed its first investiture vote, with 166 votes in favor and 165 opposed with 18 abstentions and one UP parliamentarian absent, therefore the government fell short of an absolute majority. On 7 January, the investiture motion, this time requiring only a simple majority, passed with 167 votes in favour and 165 against. PSOE, UP, En Comú Podem, Grupo Común da Esquerda, PNV, Más País, Compromís, NCa, the Galician Nationalist Bloc (BNG) and Teruel Existe (TE) voted in favor of the government, with PP, Vox, Cs, Together for Catalonia (JxCat), the Popular Unity Candidacy (CUP), NA+, CC, PRC and FAC voting against while ERC and EH Bildu both abstained.

On 2021, PSOE started a podcast called Donde hay partido.

Political ideology

From Marxism to social democracy 

The PSOE was founded with the purpose of representing and defending the interests of the proletariat formed during the Industrial Revolution in the 19th century. In its beginnings, the PSOE's main objective was the defense of worker's rights and the achievement of the ideals of socialism, emerging from contemporary philosophy and Marxist politics, by securing political power for the working class and establish a dictatorship of the proletariat in order to achieve social ownership of the means of production. The ideology of the PSOE has evolved throughout the 20th century according to relevant historical events and the evolution of Spanish society.

In 1979, the party abandoned its definitive Marxist thesis at the hands of its Secretary-General Felipe González, not before overcoming great tensions and two party congresses, the first of which preferred to maintain Marxism. Before this situation, notable internal leaders such as Pablo Castellano and Luis Gómez Llorente founded the internal faction of Left Socialists which included the militants who would not renounce Marxism. This allowed for the consolidation of the leftist forces in the PSOE. From this moment, the diverse events both outside and within the party led to projects that resembled those of other European social-democratic parties and acceptance of the defence of the market economy. The democratic socialist faction has been especially critical of the party's Third Way move to the centre starting in the 1980s for its economic liberal nature, denouncing the policies of deregulation, cuts in social benefits, and privatisations.

The PSOE defines itself as social democratic, left-wing and progressive. It is grouped with other self-styled socialists, social democrats and labour parties in the Party of European Socialists, and supports pro-Europeanism. During his shift to the left in 2017, party leader Pedro Sánchez stood for a refoundation of social democracy in order to transition to a post-capitalist society and end neoliberal capitalism as well as for the indissoluble link between social democracy and Europe.

Electoral performance

Restoration and Republican Cortes

Cortes Generales

European Parliament

Results timeline

Terms 
 Baron: unofficial term for the party's regional leaders. They can be very powerful, especially if they run an autonomous community. There have been conflicts between barons and the central directorate in the past. Some barons were Pasqual Maragall (Catalonia), who did not run for re-election in 2006; Juan Carlos Rodríguez Ibarra (Extremadura), who did not run for re-election in 2007; Manuel Chaves (Andalucia), who renounced Andalucia's presidency in 2009 to assume the Third Vice Presidency of the Spanish Government; and José Montilla (Catalonia). The term baron is more colloquial than official, representing the great power regional leaders have in the party, but it has been falling out of use since 2008.
 Compañero ("companion", "comrade"): a term of address among Socialists, analogous to the English comrade and the Russian tovarisch.
 There have been several currents or internal groups within the PSOE based on personal or ideological affinities. Some of them have ended with separation from the PSOE. The failed trial of primary elections for PSOE candidates was an attempt to conciliate currents. Examples of currents are Guerristas (followers of Alfonso Guerra), Renovadores (Renewers, right-wing of the party) or Izquierda Socialista (Socialist Left).

Leaders 
The Secretary General is the head of the party as well as its parliamentary chair.

Regional secretary-generals 

 Andalusia: Juan Espadas Cejas (since 2021)
 Aragon: Javier Lambán Montañés (since 2012)
 Asturias: Adrián Barbón Rodríguez (since 2017)
 Balearic Islands: Francina Armengol i Socías (since 2012)
 Basque Country: Eneko Andueza Lorenzo (since 2021)
 Canary Islands: Ángel Víctor Torres Pérez (since 2017)
 Cantabria: Pablo Zuloaga Martínez (since 2017)
 Castile and León: Luis Tudanca Fernández (since 2014)
 Castilla-La Mancha: Emiliano García-Page Sánchez (since 2012)
 Catalonia: Salvador Illa Roca (since 2021)
 Ceuta: Juan Gutiérrez Torres (since 2021)
 Community of Madrid: Juan Lobato Gandarias (since 2021)
 Extremadura: Guillermo Fernández Vara (since 2008)
 Galicia: Valentín González Formoso (since 2021)
 La Rioja: Concha Andreu Rodríguez (since 2021)
 Melilla: Gloria Rojas Ruiz (since 2017)
 Murcia: José Vélez Fernández (since 2021)
 Navarre: María Chivite Navascués (since 2014)
 Valencian Community: Ximo Puig Ferrer (since 2012)

Notable members

Former logos

See also 

 List of political parties in Spain
 Politics of Spain

References 
Informational notes

Citations

Bibliography

External links

 Official website

 
Political parties established in 1879
1879 establishments in Spain
Full member parties of the Socialist International
Members of the Labour and Socialist International
Centre-left parties in Europe
Party of European Socialists member parties
Progressive Alliance
Second International
Social democratic parties in Europe
Social democratic parties in Spain
Pro-European political parties in Spain